Human body shape is a complex phenomenon with sophisticated detail and function. The general shape or figure of a person is defined mainly by the molding of skeletal structures, as well as the distribution of muscles and fat. Skeletal structure grows and changes only up to the point at which a human reaches adulthood and remains essentially the same for the rest of their life. Growth is usually completed between the ages of 13 and 18, at which time the epiphyseal plates of long bones close, allowing no further growth (see Human skeleton).

Many aspects of body shape vary with gender and the female body shape especially has a complicated cultural history.  The science of measuring and assessing body shape is called anthropometry.

Physiology 
During puberty, differentiation of the male and female body occurs for the purposes of reproduction. In adult humans, muscle mass may change due to exercise, and fat distribution may change due to hormone fluctuations. Inherited genes play a large part in the development of body shape.

Facial features 

Due to the action of testosterone, males may develop these facial-bone features during puberty:
 A more prominent brow bone  (bone across the centre of the forehead from around the middle of eyebrow across to the middle of the other) and a larger nose bone.
 A heavier jaw.
 A wider face.
 A more prominent chin.

Because females have around 1/4 the amount of testosterone of a male, the testosterone-dependent features do not develop to the same extent.

Skeletal structure 

Skeletal structure frames the overall shape of the body and does not alter much after maturity.  Males are, on average, taller, but body shape may be analyzed after normalizing with respect to height. The length of each bone is constant, but the joint angle will change as the bone moves.

Female traits 

Widening of the hip bones occurs as part of the female pubertal process, and estrogens (the predominant sex hormones in females) cause a widening of the pelvis as a part of sexual differentiation. Hence females generally have wider hips, permitting childbirth. Because the female pelvis is flatter, more rounded and proportionally larger, the head of the fetus may pass during childbirth. The sacrum in females is shorter and wider, and also directed more toward the rear (see image). This sometimes affects their walking style, resulting in hip sway. The upper limb in females have an outward angulation (carrying angle) at elbow level to accommodate the wider pelvis. After puberty, hips are generally wider than shoulders. However, not all females adhere to this stereotypical pattern of secondary sex characteristics. Both male and female hormones are present in the human body, and though only one of them is predominant in an adult, the other hormone has effects on body shape to some extent.

Male traits 

Widening of the shoulders occurs as part of the male pubertal process. Expansion of the ribcage is caused by the effects of testosterone during puberty.

Fat distribution, muscles and tissues 

Body shape is affected by body fat distribution, which is correlated to current levels of sex hormones. Unlike bone structure, muscles and fat distribution may change from time to time, depending on food habits, exercises and hormone levels.

Fat distribution 

Estrogen causes fat to be stored in the buttocks, thighs, and  hips in females. When females reach menopause and the estrogen produced by ovaries declines, fat migrates from their buttocks, hips and thighs to their waists. Later fat is stored in the belly, similar to males. Thus females generally have relatively narrow waists and large buttocks, and this along with wide hips make for a wider hip section and a lower waist–hip ratio compared to males. Hormonal and genetic factors may produce male-like distribution of fat in women i.e. around the belly instead of buttocks and thighs.

Estrogen increases fat storage in the body, which results in more fat stored in the female body.  Body fat percentage guidelines are higher for females,  as this may serve as an energy reserve for pregnancy.  Males generally deposit fat around waists and abdomens (producing an "apple shape").

Muscles 

Testosterone helps build and maintain muscles through exercise. On average, men have around 10 times more testosterone than women. Prominent muscles of the body include the latissimus dorsi, trapezius, pectoral muscles (muscles critical for a strong erect posture) as well as biceps and triceps in the arms and quadriceps and hamstrings in the thighs.

Breasts 
Females have enlarged breasts due to functional mammary glands, which develop from puberty onward due to the effects of estrogen. Mammary glands do not contain muscle tissue. The shape of female breasts is affected by age, genetic factors, and body weight.

Weight 
Being overweight or underweight causes change in the human body's shape as well as posture and walking style. This is measured using Body Mass Index (BMI) or waist circumference. Depending on the BMI, a body may be referred to as slim, overweight, or obese.

Dieting, in conjunction with exercise, may be used to bring and keep the BMI within a healthy or desired range.
A person can calculate BMI, that is body mass index, to check that where they lie in terms of weight and height. A BMI between 18.5 and 24.9 is ideal.
A person with a BMI below 18.5 is classed as underweight, above 24.9 is overweight and a BMI of 30 or higher is defined as Obese. 

The fats and carbohydrates in food constitute the majority of energy used by the body. They are measured cumulatively in the USA and many other places in  calories and in kilojoules in some other parts of the world.

Body posture and gait 
Body shape has effects on body posture and gait, and has a major role in physical attraction. This is because a body's shape implies an individual's hormone levels during puberty, which implies fertility, and it also indicates current levels of sex hormones. A pleasing shape also implies good health and fitness of the body. Posture also affects body shape as different postures significantly alter body measurements, which thus can alter a body’s shape.

Impact on health 
According to the Heart and Stroke Foundation of Canada, those people with a larger waist (apple shaped) have higher health risks than those who carry excess weight on the hips and thighs (pear shaped). People with apple shaped bodies who carry excess weight are at greater risk of high blood pressure, Type 2 diabetes and high cholesterol.

Fitness and exercise 
Different forms of exercises are practiced for the fitness of the body and also for health. It is a common belief that targeted exercise reduces fat in specific parts of the body —for example, that exercising muscles around the belly reduces fat in the belly. This, however, is now proven to be a misconception; these exercises may change body shape by improving muscle tone but any fat reduction is not specific to the locale. Spot reduction exercises are not useful unless you plan proper exercise regime to lose overall calories. But exercising reduces fat throughout the body, and where fat is stored depends on hormones. Liposuction is surgery commonly used in developed societies to remove fat from the body.

Social and cultural ideals 

The general body shapes of female and male bodies both have significant social and cultural symbolism. Physical attractiveness is closely associated with traits that are considered typical of either sex. The body mass index (BMI), waist-to-hip ratio, and especially waist-to-chest ratio in men have been shown in studies to rank as overall more desirable to women. To be deemed to have an "athletic built"/build is usually a reference  to wide shoulders, a muscular upper body and well-developed upper-arm muscles  which are all traits closely associated with masculinity, similarly to other specifics of the male sex, like beards. These traits are seen more sexually attractive to women and also associated with higher intelligence, good leadership qualities and better health.

Terminology 
Classifications of female body sizes are mainly based on the circumference of the bust–waist–hip (BWH), as in 36–24–36 (inches) respectively. In this case, the waist–hip ratio is 24/36 = 0.67. Many terms or classifications are used to describe body shape types:

V shape: Males tend to have proportionally smaller buttocks, bigger chests and wider shoulders, wider latissimus dorsi and a small waist which makes for a V-shape of the torso. 
Hourglass shape: The female body is significantly narrower in the waist both in front view and profile view. The waist is narrower than the chest region due to the breasts, and narrower than the hip region due to the width of the buttocks, which results in an hourglass shape.
Apple: The stomach region is wider than the hip section, mainly in males.
Pear or spoon or bell: The hip section is wider than the upper body, mainly in females.
Rectangle or straight or banana: The hip, waist, and shoulder sections are relatively similar.

See also 

 
 
  (BMI)
  ("Vital statistics")
 
 
 
 
 
 
 

 
 
 
  (discredited fringe theory)
 Waist-hip ratio 
 Waist-to-height ratio

Notes

References

External links 
 Reproductive Anatomy and Physiology
 Clues to Mysteries Of Physical Attractiveness Revealed

 
Physical attractiveness